Takashi Miwa (三輪 隆, born December 1, 1969) is a former professional baseball player from Chiba, Japan.  He was drafted by the Orix BlueWave in the second round of the 1993 amateur draft, and played with the team until 2004.  He was the team representative for the BlueWave in the Japanese baseball players union during the 2004 Japanese baseball strike.

He won a bronze medal in the 1992 Summer Olympics before entering the Japanese professional leagues.

External links
 Career statistics

1969 births
Living people
People from Kashiwa
Meiji University alumni
Nippon Professional Baseball catchers
Orix BlueWave players
Baseball players at the 1992 Summer Olympics
Olympic baseball players of Japan
Olympic bronze medalists for Japan
Olympic medalists in baseball
Japanese baseball coaches
Nippon Professional Baseball coaches
Medalists at the 1992 Summer Olympics
Baseball people from Chiba Prefecture